Arkabutla is a census-designated place and unincorporated community in Tate County, Mississippi, United States. Although an unincorporated community, it has a post office and a zip code of 38602.

The community derives its name from Arkabutla Creek.

Per the 2020 Census, the population was 285.

History

2023 shooting spree

On February 17, 2023, six people were killed and a seventh person injured in a shooting spree at three homes and a convenience store in Arkabutla. The sole suspect, identified as 52-year-old Richard Dale Crum, was arrested by police at one of the homes, and he was charged with first-degree murder. One of the deceased victims was Crum's ex-wife.

Demographics

2020 census

Note: the US Census treats Hispanic/Latino as an ethnic category. This table excludes Latinos from the racial categories and assigns them to a separate category. Hispanics/Latinos can be of any race.

Notable person
 James Earl Jones, actor

References

Unincorporated communities in Tate County, Mississippi
Unincorporated communities in Mississippi
Census-designated places in Tate County, Mississippi
Memphis metropolitan area
Mississippi placenames of Native American origin